Jonathan Ward (September 21, 1768, Eastchester, Westchester County, New York – September 28, 1842, Eastchester, NY) was an American politician from New York.

Life
He received limited schooling. Ward was Sheriff of Westchester County from 1802 to 1806, a member of the New York State Senate from 1807 to 1810, and a member of the Council of Appointment in 1809.

He was elected as a Democratic-Republican to the 14th United States Congress, holding office from March 4, 1815, to March 3, 1817. He was a delegate to the New York State Constitutional Convention of 1821, and was Surrogate of Westchester County from 1828 to 1840.

References

The New York Civil List compiled by Franklin Benjamin Hough (pages 70, 147 and 419; Weed, Parsons and Co., 1858)

1768 births
1842 deaths
New York (state) state senators
People from Eastchester, New York
New York (state) sheriffs
New York (state) state court judges
Democratic-Republican Party members of the United States House of Representatives from New York (state)